The Philippine Postal Corporation, abbreviated as PHLPost and also known as the Philippine Post Office, is a government-owned and controlled corporation responsible for providing postal services in the Philippines.  The Philippine Postal Corporation has in excess of 8,000 employees and runs more than 1,355 post offices nationwide.  The Philippine Post Office is based in the Philippines' primary post office, and is currently headed by Postmaster General and CEO Mr. Norman "Postman" N. Fulgencio. The historic Manila Central Post Office is situated at the Plaza Liwasang Bonifacio and overlooks the Pasig River.  Its policy-making body is the board of directors, headed by its chairman, Mr.  Raul R. Bendigo. The board of directors is composed of seven members, including the postmaster general, who serves simultaneously as the chief executive officer.

Previously an attached agency of the Department of Transportation and Communications (DOTC) and the Commission on Information and Communication Technology (CICT), the Philippine Postal Corporation is under the direct jurisdiction of the Office of the President of the Philippines.

The Overseas Filipino Bank, previously the Philippine Postal Savings Bank, is one of three government-owned banks in the Philippines, it was formerly organized under PHLPost. Now, it is a separate company.

History

The Philippine postal system has a history spanning over 250 years.  In 1767, the first post office in the Philippines was established in the city of Manila, which was later organized under a new postal district of Spain. At first, the postal office served mainly to courier government and church documents. In 1779, the postal district encompassed Manila and the entire Philippine archipelago.  The postal district was reestablished on December 5, 1837.  A year later, Manila became known as a leading center of postal services within Asia.  Spain joined the Universal Postal Union in 1875, which was announced in the Philippines two years later. By then post offices were set up not only in Manila but in many major towns and cities in the provinces.

During the Philippine Revolution, President Emilio Aguinaldo ordered the establishment of a postal service to provide postal services to Filipinos.  It was later organized as a bureau under the Department of Trade on September 5, 1902, by virtue of Act No. 426, which was passed by the Philippine Commission. The Philippines eventually joined the Universal Postal Union, this time as a sovereign entity, on January 1, 1922.

While the Manila Central Post Office building, the center of Philippine postal services and the headquarters of the then-Bureau of Posts, was completed in its present-day Neo-Classical style in 1926, it was destroyed during World War II. After the war, the Central Post Office was rebuilt in 1946.

With the overhaul of the Philippine bureaucracy in 1987, the Bureau of Posts was renamed the Postal Service Office (PSO) by Executive Order No. 125, issued by President Corazon Aquino on April 13, 1987.  It was also on that order that the Post Service Office (PSO) was placed  under the DOTC. On April 2, 1992, by Republic Act No. 7354. The Postal Service Office became the present-day PHLPost. The law also granted the Philippines Postal Corporation, the authority to reopen the Philippine Postal Savings Bank, which is now called Overseas Filipino Bank, a subsidiary of LandBank. Presently, Norman N. Fulgencio, a former chairman of the PHLPost board of directors, was appointed as the new Postmaster General and CEO of the Philippine Postal Corporation (PHLPost) under the Office of the President on March 15, 2021, by former President Rodrigo Roa Duterte.

See also
Commission on Information and Communications Technology
List of postal codes in the Philippines
Postal addresses in the Philippines
Postage stamps and postal history of the Philippines

References

External links

Members Countries of Universal Postal Union

Logistics companies of the Philippines
Postal system of the Philippines
Postal organizations
Philately of the Philippines
Government-owned and controlled corporations of the Philippines
Companies based in Manila
Transport companies established in 1992
Philippine brands
Government agencies under the Office of the President of the Philippines